The following is a list of the mountains and hills of Japan, ordered by height.

Mountains over 1000 meters

Mountains under 1000 meters 

As the generally accepted definition of a mountain (versus a hill) is 1000 m of height and 500 m of prominence, the following list is provided for convenience only.

See also 
List of Japanese prefectures by highest mountain

References

External links 

 Mt. Nakanodake：Hiking route｜Snow Country
 
 
 Japan Ultra-Prominences
 Japan 100 Mountains
 Yokosuka City sightseeing,Ōgusuyama 

Mountains of Japan
Height